"Living in the 70's" is a song by Australian band Skyhooks. Released in August 1974 as their debut and lead single from the band's debut album of the same name. The song peaked  at number 28 in Australia. The band performed the song live on Countdown.

In 2018, the song was ranked at number 72 as part of Triple M's "Ozzest 100", the 'most Australian' songs of all time ranking.

Track listing
7" single (K-5628)
 Side A "Living in the 70's" - 3:44
 Side B "You're a Broken Gin Bottle, Baby" - 4:14

Charts

References 

1974 singles
Mushroom Records singles
1974 songs
Songs written by Greg Macainsh
Skyhooks (band) songs